Tiny Times is a Chinese film series directed and written by Guo Jingming, all adapted from his novels.

The first installment of the series based on the first novel was released on June 27, 2013. A sequel titled Tiny Times 2, which was filmed together with the first film and based on the second half of the novel, was released on August 8, 2013. Tiny Times 3, the third installment of the franchise was released on July 17, 2014. Tiny Times 4, the fourth and last film of the series, was released on July 9, 2015.  Though the series has received negative reviews from Chinese film critics, Tiny Times has become one of the most successful  movie franchises, and has garnered many fans among young Chinese cinema-going audience.

Characters

Central cast

Main cast

Supporting cast

Installments

Tiny Times 1.0

Tiny Times 2: Aurora's Generation

Tiny Times 3: Times of Gold Filigree

Tiny Times 4: Soul's End

Critical reviews

Materialism
The series has been slammed for its overt celebration of materialism.; as well as the product placement of luxury brands in the films. Film critic Raymond Chou said the film's message is "hinting to the young generation that you can do anything to win material goods because that’s how your value is determined."

Depiction of women
The series has sparked controversy and debate over its depiction of women in the film. Though often compared with Sex and the City, critics argue the women in Tiny Times does not exhibit the same kind of fierceness and independence as their Western counterparts. Critics have expressed their concerns that Shanghainese women in the film are portrayed as "vapid and shallow", setting backwards gender equality in China.

At the same time, the series has been condemned for its portrayal of male narcissism. The Atlantic said that the films speak to "the male fantasy of a world of female yearnings, which revolve around men and the goods men are best equipped to deliver, whether materially or bodily. It betrays a twisted male narcissism and a male desire for patriarchal power and control over female bodies and emotions misconstrued as female longing; which is symptomatic of a society where the choices for women are severely limited."

Content
In spite of negative reviews, the series has garnered praises for its glossy cinematography and production value.

Performance
The film has been criticized for the acting ability of the cast. Lead actress Yang Mi has been nominated thrice (and won for all three times) at the Golden Broom Awards as the "Most Disappointing Actress" for her performance in Tiny Times franchise.

Reflection on China's societal trends
Demographic changes in China has led to the production of similar teen films. Stephen Cremin of Film Business Asia said it is “the first high-profile film to appeal primarily to the generation born in the 1990s who’ve become the main moviegoing audience in China”. Cremin compares the controversy to the first opening of McDonald's in China, which faced opposition from the older generation but was soon assimilated into China's ever-changing film landscape.

Commercial success
Despite its negative reviews and criticism, the film has enjoyed commercial success. The first installment of the film breaks the opening-day box office record for a Chinese-language 2D release.

This is credited to its strong teenage and young adult fanbase, who are lured by the film's attractive stars and glamorous Shanghai setting. The People's Daily was critical of the film and said Guo had "cleverly gotten hold of his own target audience -- the vast teenage demographic." Research conducted by the producers enables Guo to make commercial films that successfully cater to the new generation of young Chinese, who have Western-style values.

References

 
Guo Jingming
Chinese film series